Miki Matsue Matheson (松江美季) is a three time Paralympic gold medalist in Ice sledge speed racing at the Winter Paralympics. A car accident led to her disability. Currently she lives in Canada with her husband, former Paralympic ice sledge hockey player Shawn Matheson.

References 

Living people
Japanese expatriate sportspeople in Canada
Paralympic ice sledge speed racers of Japan
Year of birth missing (living people)
Paralympic gold medalists for Japan
Paralympic silver medalists for Japan
Medalists at the 1998 Winter Paralympics
Ice sledge speed racers at the 1998 Winter Paralympics
Paralympic medalists in ice sledge speed racing